Thomond College of Education, Limerick (Coláiste Oideachais Thuamhurnhan, Luimneach in Irish) was established in 1973 in Limerick, Ireland as the National College of Physical Education to train physical education teachers. The college was renamed to Thomond College of Education in 1975 when subjects other than physical education were added. These included metalwork, rural science, and woodwork.

The college was located on the same campus as National Institute for Higher Education, Limerick (now University of Limerick) in Plassey, Limerick on a separate site purchased in 1971 for the college. 

During 1976 and 1977 the college was a recognised college of the National University of Ireland. After this the college was accredited by the National Council for Educational Awards for the remainder of its existence. 

The college was placed on a statutory basis in 1980. 

In 1991 the college was dissolved and integrated into the University of Limerick, and now forms the Department of Educational and Professional Studies at the university.

References

External links
National University of Ireland
University of Limerick
Thomond College of Education, Limerick, Act, 1980
University of Limerick (Dissolution of Thomond College) Act, 1991

University of Limerick
Former universities and colleges in the Republic of Ireland
Former education schools in Ireland
1973 establishments in Ireland
1991 disestablishments in Ireland